The "Dokkōdō"  ("The Path of Aloneness", "The Way to Go Forth Alone", or "The Way of Walking Alone") is a short work written by Miyamoto Musashi a week before he died in 1645. It consists of 21 precepts. "Dokkodo" was largely composed on the occasion of Musashi giving away his possessions in preparation for death, and was dedicated to his favorite disciple, Terao Magonojō (to whom the earlier Go rin no sho [The Book of Five Rings] had also been dedicated), who took them to heart. "Dokkōdō" expresses a stringent, honest, and ascetic view of life.

Principles
The 21 principles of Dokkodo:

1. Accept everything just the way it is.

2. Do not seek pleasure for its own sake.

3. Do not, under any circumstances, depend on a partial feeling.

4. Think lightly of yourself and deeply of the world.

5. Be detached from desire your whole life long.

6. Do not regret what you have done.

7. Never be jealous.

8. Never let yourself be saddened by a separation.

9. Resentment and complaint are appropriate neither for oneself nor others.

10. Do not let yourself be guided by the feeling of lust or love.

11. In all things have no preferences.

12. Be indifferent to where you live.

13. Do not pursue the taste of good food.

14. Do not hold on to possessions you no longer need.

15. Do not act following customary beliefs.

16. Do not collect weapons or practice with weapons beyond what is useful.

17. Do not fear death.

18. Do not seek to possess either goods or fiefs for your old age.

19. Respect Buddha and the gods without counting on their help.

20. You may abandon your own body but you must preserve your honor.

21. Never stray from the Way.

References

External links
 Translation of "Dokkōdō"
 "Dōkkodō" in the original handwriting (archived version; original can be found here )
The last words of Miyamoto Musashi − An attempt to translate his − "Dokkôdô", paper written by Teruo MACHIDA, in “Bulletin of Nippon Sport Science University”, Vol. 36, No. 1, 2006, pp. 105–120 (PDF in English )

1645 books
Japanese books
Philosophy books
Asceticism
Warrior code
Codes of conduct
Miyamoto Musashi